All Because of You is the second studio album by American country music singer Daryle Singletary. It was released on October 8, 1996, via Giant Records. Although its lead-off single "Amen Kind of Love" reached #2 on the U.S. country singles charts, the next two singles ("The Used to Be's" and "Even the Wind") both missed Top 40. The album was produced by David Malloy and James Stroud, who also produced Singletary's 1995 self-titled debut.

Track listing

Personnel
Adapted from liner notes.

Musicians
Kathy Burdick – background vocals
Larry Byrom – electric guitar, acoustic guitar
Paul Franklin – steel guitar
Dann Huff – electric guitar, acoustic guitar
Paul Leim – drums
Brent Mason – electric guitar
Jimmy Nichols – keyboards, background vocals
Steve Nathan – keyboards
Michael Rhodes – bass guitar
Hargus "Pig" Robbins – piano
Matt Rollings – keyboards
Daryle Singletary – lead vocals
Joe Spivey – fiddle
Lonnie Wilson – drums
Glenn Worf – bass guitar
Curtis Wright – background vocals
Curtis Young – background vocals

Chart performance

References

1996 albums
Albums produced by James Stroud
Daryle Singletary albums
Giant Records (Warner) albums
Albums produced by David Malloy